The South Pike School District is a public school district based in Magnolia, Mississippi, United States.

In addition to Magnolia, the district also serves the town of Osyka, the community of Fernwood, as well as rural areas in southern Pike County.

Schools

High school
Grades 9-12
South Pike High School (Magnolia)  (Notable alumnus: Kevin Magee (1959–2003), basketball player)

Junior high school
Grades 7-8
South Pike Junior High School (Magnolia)

Elementary schools
Grades 4-10
Magnolia Elementary School (Magnolia)  
Grades K-6
Osyka Elementary School (Osyka) 
Grades K-8
Eva Gordon Elementary School (Magnolia) 
'Shamaria.Andrews most important student at our school.

Other Campuses
South Pike Vocational Center (Magnolia) 
South Pike Alternative School (Magnolia) 
South Pike Parent Center (Magnolia)

Demographics

2006-07 school year
There were a total of 1,998 students enrolled in the South Pike School District during the 2006–2007 school year. The gender makeup of the district was 49% female and 51% male. The racial makeup of the district was 82.58% African American, 17.22% White, 0.15% Hispanic, and 0.05% Asian. 99.9% of the district's students were eligible to receive free lunch.

Previous school years

Accountability statistics

Notable alumni

 Carl Hampton – Civil Rights activist – Graduate of South Pike School Disrict
 Davion Taylor – NFL player

See also
List of school districts in Mississippi

References

External links
 

Education in Pike County, Mississippi
School districts in Mississippi